Pradeep Rangana (ප්‍රදීප් රංගන) (born 12 November 1983), is a Sri Lankan medical doctor, singer, and songwriter. He was the winner in the second season of Sirasa Superstar. He currently works as a doctor in Marathenna Regional Hospital, Balangoda.

Early life and background
Rangana was born on 12 November 1983 in Weralupe, Rathnapura. His father, Y.M. Abeysinghe, taught him to sing and whistle, and arranged music events in their home when Rangana and his two sisters were growing up. He studied at St. Thomas’s College, Bandarawela, before being accepted to medical school at the University of Ruhuna. 

In his third year of medical school, Rangana auditioned for the second season of Sirasa Superstar, and was selected to participate in the talent competition. On 31 October 2007, he won the final round held at Sugathadasa Stadium.

Marriage 

Pradeep married his long-time partner, Chathurika Prasadini, on 2 August 2015.

Singing career
After being named Superstar, Pradeep recorded and released his first album, Aadambarakari. The official DVD launch was held on 31 March 2009 at R.Premadasa Stadium, timed to the start of Sirasa Superstar's third season.

Pradeep wrote his first song (for his father) when he was eight. He wrote 12 songs before he appeared on Sirasa Superstar.

In 2014, Pradeep's song "Pem Sihine" won the Most Popular Music Video award at the Derana Music Video Awards. He followed that up in March 2016 with the single "Pem Sihine 2 - Mayawi".

On 8 April 2008, the Pradeep and Friends in Concert was held at Bandaranaike Memorial International Conference Hall (BMICH). It was organized by the Ruhuna Medical School Alumni Association (RUMSAA) to help Ruhuna Medical Faculty. On 1 June 2008, Rangana performed with other season two finalists at the Sugathadasa Indoor Stadium to support the Help Samitha Fund; Samitha Samanmali was a fourth-year medical undergraduate of the Colombo Medical Faculty who suffered from a severe spinal cord injury.

Albums

Track listing

Single song tracks released

References

21st-century Sri Lankan male singers
1983 births
Living people
Sinhalese singers
Alumni of the University of Ruhuna